Charles Gibb Oakman (September 4, 1903 – October 28, 1973) was a politician from the U.S. state of Michigan.

Oakman was born in Detroit, Michigan; attended the public schools and Wayne State University.  He graduated from the University of Michigan at Ann Arbor in 1926 and engaged in the real estate and transportation business 1927-1940.  He was also a member of the Wayne County Board of Supervisors 1941-1952; served as executive secretary to the mayor of Detroit in 1941 and 1942; city controller 1942-1945; served four terms as city councilman 1947-1952; secretary of the Detroit-Wayne Joint Building Authority 1948-1954 and general manager 1955-1973.

In 1952, Oakman defeated Democrat Martha W. Griffiths to be elected as a Republican from  Michigan's 17th congressional district to the 83rd Congress, serving from January 3, 1953 to January 3, 1955 in the U.S. House.  He was an unsuccessful candidate for reelection in 1954 to the 84th Congress, losing to Griffiths in a rematch.

On February 8, 1954, Oakman introduced a bill to the U.S. House that would add the words "under God" to the Pledge of Allegiance. U.S. Senator from Michigan Homer S. Ferguson introduced the bill to the U.S. Senate. The bill became law on  Flag Day, June 14, 1954.

Oakman was a Presbyterian and a member of Freemasons, Knights Templar, Shriners, Elks, and Alpha Sigma Phi.  He died in Dearborn, Michigan and is interred at Roseland Park Cemetery of Berkley, Michigan.

References

Charles G. Oakman at The Political Graveyard

External links 

1903 births
1973 deaths
American Freemasons
Burials in Michigan
County officials in Michigan
Detroit City Council members
Politicians from Detroit
Republican Party members of the United States House of Representatives from Michigan
University of Michigan alumni
Wayne State University alumni
20th-century American politicians